Iba Airfield is a former United States Army Air Forces airfield on Luzon in the Philippines. It was overrun by the Imperial Japanese Army during the Battle of the Philippines (1942).

History
The airfield was a former training camp for the Philippine Constabulary on the western coast of Luzon in Zambales province. In the summer of 1941 it was placed in use by the Americans as a gunnery training field for pursuit (fighter) units. The Far East Air Force sent the 3d Pursuit Squadron, 24th Pursuit Group to Iba for aerial gunnery training in its new P-40E Warhawks in mid-October, where it was when war broke out on 8 December 1941. In addition to the pursuit planes, the first operational SCR-270 mobile early-warning radar was deployed to the airfield at the same time. Iba was a grass field with few support facilities.

The first word of the Japanese attack on Pearl Harbor was received by commercial radio between 0300–0330 hours local. Within 30 minutes radar at Iba Field, Luzon plotted a formation of airplanes 75-miles (120-km) offshore, heading for Corregidor Island. P-40's were sent out to intercept but made no contact. By 1130 hours, the fighters sent into the air earlier landed for refueling, and
radar disclosed another flight of Japanese aircraft 70-miles (112-km) West of Lingayen Gulf, headed south. Fighters from Iba Field made another fruitless search over the South China Sea. The P-40's sent on patrol of the South China Sea returned to Iba with fuel running low at the beginning of a Japanese attack on the airfield. The P-40's failed to prevent bombing but did manage to contest the
low-level strafing of the sort which proved so destructive at Clark Field soon after. The radar set at Iba, however, was destroyed in the attack and the 3rd PS decimated.

On 9 December, the remnants of the 3d Pursuit Squadron relocated to Nichols Field. The airfield was abandoned by the USAAF about 20 December prior to it being overrun by the invading Imperial Japanese Army. After its occupation, it was used by Japanese aircraft as a satellite field for the Clark area.

See also
Geography of the Philippines
Military History of the Philippines
Military History of the United States
 United States Army Air Forces in the South West Pacific Theatre

Images

References

 Maurer, Maurer (1983). Air Force Combat Units of World War II. Maxwell AFB, Alabama: Office of Air Force History. .
 
 The Army Air Forces in World War II, Chapter 6, Pearl Harbor and Clark Field

External links

 Iba Airfield Zambaless Province
Map of Iba Airfield 
Airfields in Philippines
Maps of Iba Airfield - Philippines 2013
Iba Airfield - Airfield in Panibuatan, Zambales, Philippines

World War II airfields in the Philippines
Military history of the Philippines during World War II
Iba Field
Airfields of the United States Army Air Corps during the Battle of the Philippines (1941–42)
History of Zambales